"A Cradle Song" is a poem written by William Blake in 1789, as part of his book Songs of Innocence.

Structure 
The 32-line poem is divided into 8 stanzas of 4 lines each.  Each stanza follows an "AABB" rhyme scheme.

“A Cradle Song” follows a couplet structure where each pair of lines rhyme. This lends the poem a graceful sound and makes it easy to sing. While writing this poem, Blake drew from the image of a mother sitting over her infant while the baby is in her crib falling sleep.

Background

Blake was born in London on November 28, 1757. He died on August 12, 1827. He claimed that in a dream his brother Robert taught him the printing method that he used in Songs of Innocence and other illuminated works. Songs of Innocence includes poems about children and the clash between the corruption of the world and the innocence of youth. He uses imagery throughout Songs of Innocence.

Paraphrase
In “A Cradle Song”, a mother sings to her child, asking the infant to stay asleep. The mother asks her child to sleep through the night. While she looks at her infant's face, the mother sees Jesus. When she sees the infant smiling, she sees Jesus smiling at her and the world. At the end of the poem, she states how heaven and earth are at peace and have harmony when she sees her baby smile.

Analysis

A key theme in “A Cradle Song” is the mother's love for her child. The mother uses the word “sweet” ten times in the poem. She makes the infant seem angelic by the way she describes the child. The mother claims her child is “dovelike”, using the dove as a symbol for holiness and love. The woman ties the spiritual world to the physical. She notes how she can trace His (Christ's) holy image on her baby. The mother tells the baby to sleep as she cries, representing how the mother is aware of the sinful world her baby will grow up and eventually die in. She claims how Jesus wept for all and wept for her. The mother has faith that her infant will be okay even when she can no longer protect her, but it still saddens her to not be able to shield her from the world.

In music
There are famous artists that have claimed that they were inspired by William Blake, including Bob Dylan, John Lennon, and The Beatles, Bono and U2, Led Zeppelin, and many more. Some have even used Blake's poems in the creation of their music. In A Charm of Lullabies, Benjamin Britten sets "A Cradle Song" to music alongside four other poems.

References

Further reading

Davies, Keri.  "Blake Set to Music." Zoamorphosis.com. N.p., 08 Aug. 2010. Web. 

"Synopsis and Commentary." » Songs of Innocence and Experience Study Guide from Crossref-it.info. N.p., n.d. Web. 29 Mar. 2015.
Vines, Timothy.  ANALYSIS OF WILLIAM BLAKE’S SONGS OF INNOCENCE (n.d.): n. pag. Web.

Songs about parenthood
1789 poems
Songs of Innocence and of Experience
Lullabies
Motherhood